Saint-Maxime may refer to:

 Sainte-Maxime, a commune in the Var department of the Provence-Alpes-Côte d'Azur region in Southeastern France.
 Saint-Maxime-du-Mont-Louis, Quebec, a municipality in Quebec, Canada